Grimblethorpe is a hamlet in the East Lindsey district of Lincolnshire, England. It is in the civil parish of Gayton le Wold.

The village was a civil parish between 1858 and 1931, after which it became part of Gayton le Wold parish.

Grimblethorpe Hall is a Grade II* listed building dating from 1620, and built of red brick. It was possibly built for Sir Ralph Maddestone, who held Grimblethorpe at the end of the 16th century.

It contains archaeological items, including human remains, and is an ancient scheduled monument.

References

External links

Hamlets in Lincolnshire
East Lindsey District
Former civil parishes in Lincolnshire